Shooting sports was contested at the 2005 West Asian Games in Doha, Qatar from December 2 to December 6. All competition took place at Al-Duhail Shooting Range.

Medalists

Men

Women

Medal table

References

External links
Official website (archived)

2005 West Asian Games
2005 in shooting sports
2005
Shooting competitions in Qatar